Route 104 is a short highway in Washington County, Missouri.  It begins and ends at Route 21 in Washington State Park.  No towns are along the route.

Route description
Route 104 begins at an intersection with Route 21 in Washington State Park, heading northeast as a two-lane undivided road. The route runs through forested areas of the state park, curving north before winding to the east. The road heads south before a turn to the northeast. Route 104 makes another curve to the south and ends at another intersection with Route 21.

Major intersections

References

104
Transportation in Washington County, Missouri